Damdırmaz is a village in the Adıyaman District, Adıyaman Province, Turkey. Its population is 352 (2021).

References

Villages in Adıyaman District

Kurdish settlements in Adıyaman Province